Dennis Andreev (born 12 December 1999) is a Bulgarian male acrobatic gymnast. With partners Borislav Borisov, Vladislav Borisov and Hristo Dimitrov, Andreev achieved 4th in the 2014 Acrobatic Gymnastics World Championships.

References

1999 births
Living people
Bulgarian acrobatic gymnasts
Male acrobatic gymnasts